Fabio Madiai (born in Empoli, Tuscany  on 13 July 1961) is an Italian designer and scenographer. Madiai lives and works in Florence, Italy.

Projects 
2017 Innovative Fashion Sneaker Project "Q U M A N" (Florence)

2017 Wine Shop & Food «QUARTERONI» (Pontepetri PISTOIA)

2017 Terrace Lounge – Disco Dinner Club "LA CASCINA" (Montecatini Terme) 

2016 Dinner - Disco Club "OTEL" (Florence) 

2016 Disco Dinner Club "TERRAZZA MARTINI" (Florence)

2016 Tuscany Restaurant "PANTAREI" (Florence) 

2016 Panoramic Terrace – Living Club "FLO" (Piazzale Michelangelo)

2015 Farm - Club Restaurant "VITIA" (Palo del Colle BARI)

2014 Yachting Club – Restaurant – Disco Club "SPORTING CLUB" (Campione)

2014 Disco Dinner Club "EDEN CLUB" (GROSSETO) 

2011 Restaurant Grill – Lounge "QUE' BISCHERI" (Monsummano Terme)

2010 Disco Club "BEACH CLUB" (Versilia)

2009 Disco Dinner Club LIDO' LE PANTERAIE (Montecatini Terme PISTOIA)

2005 Disco Dinner Club "COSTES" (Florence)

2005 Disco club "LA BUSSOLA" (Focette Versilia)

2004 Restaurant – Beach Disco Club "AQUARAMAMARE" (Versilia)

2002 Restaurant - Lounge - Disco Club "AQUARAMA" (Vinci)

2001, Restaurant-Lounge Club "LA FORNACE" (Florence)

References

1961 births
Living people
Italian designers